Lightship may refer to:

 Lightvessel, a moored ship that has light beacons mounted as navigational aids
 The Lightship, a 1985 American drama film directed by Jerzy Skolimowski
The Lightship (novel), by Siegfried Lenz on which the film was based
 Lightcraft, a space- or air-vehicle driven by laser propulsion
 Light displacement, a displacement figure that measures a ship complete in all respects, but without consumables, stores, cargo, crew, and effects
 Lightships, an alias of Gerard Love of Teenage Fanclub
 a spacecraft which uses a solar sail for propulsion
 a type of blimp operated by The Lightship Group, a subsidiary of the American Blimp Corporation

See also 
 List of lightships of the United States
 Lightvessels in the United Kingdom